Kim Hyeon-jeong (Hangul: 김현정, born September 30, 1973), professionally known as BMK or Big Mama King, is a South Korean singer known for her powerful voice.

Discography

Studio albums

References

K-pop singers
Living people
South Korean women pop singers
1973 births
21st-century South Korean women singers